Neochori is a village in the Arta regional unit, Epirus, Greece. Situated on the right bank of the river Arachthos, it was the seat of the former Arachthos municipality. The community has an area of 32.225 km2. As of 2011, the town's population was 1,737.

References

Populated places in Arta (regional unit)